Lewis Lawrence Mathe (March 27, 1915 – March 10, 1986) was an American world champion bridge player and administrator from Canoga Park, California.

Mathe, a native of New York, served in the Army during World War II; he enlisted two days before the attack on Pearl Harbor. He died in Los Angeles in 1986. He was inducted into the ACBL Hall of Fame in 1997.

Bridge accomplishments

Honors

 ACBL Hall of Fame, 1997

Awards

 Herman Trophy (1) 1957
 Mott-Smith Trophy (3) 1959, 1964, 1967

Wins

 Bermuda Bowl (1) 1954 
 North American Bridge Championships (19)
 von Zedtwitz Life Master Pairs (2) 1963, 1967 
 Rockwell Mixed Pairs (1) 1971 
 Silodor Open Pairs (1) 1959 
 Blue Ribbon Pairs (1) 1964 
 Open Pairs (1928-1962) (1) 1957 
 Vanderbilt (3) 1964, 1966, 1967 
 Mitchell Board-a-Match Teams (3) 1957, 1962, 1970 
 Chicago Mixed Board-a-Match (1) 1970 
 Reisinger (4) 1959, 1960, 1962, 1971 
 Spingold (2) 1953, 1954

Runners-up

 Bermuda Bowl (3) 1955, 1962, 1966 
 North American Bridge Championships
 Silodor Open Pairs (2) 1964, 1967 
 Wernher Open Pairs (1) 1961 
 Blue Ribbon Pairs (1) 1967 
 Hilliard Mixed Pairs (1) 1959 
 Nail Life Master Open Pairs (1) 1982 
 Vanderbilt (1) 1963 
 Mitchell Board-a-Match Teams (1) 1972 
 Chicago Mixed Board-a-Match (2) 1953, 1975 
 Reisinger (1) 1966 
 Spingold (2) 1971, 1974

References

External links
 
 

1915 births
1986 deaths
American contract bridge players
Bermuda Bowl players
People from Los Angeles
United States Army personnel of World War II